Rebecca Gilling (born 3 November 1953 in Castlecrag, Sydney, Australia) is an Australian former model and actress, now environmentalist.

Gilling is the daughter of World War II Navy personnel Douglas Gilling and prominent feminist campaigner Bridget Gilling.

Career

Her first acting role was in film Stone (1974) but she came to prominence in the Number 96 feature film version in 1974, as the "bad girl" flight attendant Diana Moore even though she was not a member of the regular TV series cast. Her next acting role was in the action film The Man from Hong Kong (1975).

Gilling went on to act in several television series. She was a regular support character in Glenview High (1977) and then appeared in The Young Doctors as Liz Kennedy. Gilling later achieved international recognition in both the mini-series (1983) and subsequent series (1986) of Return to Eden as Stephanie Harper.

She also appeared in The Naked Country (1985) and in TV series City West (1984), The Blue Lightning (1986), A Dangerous Life (1988), Danger Down Under (1988) and The Paper Man (1990).

During the 1990s, she had a guest appearance on medical drama G.P. and was a presenter on the Nine Network lifestyle series Our House. She later became the spokesperson for the Australian not-for-profit environmental organisation, Planet Ark. She appeared on The Project on 23 September 2019, as the Planet Ark CEO, speaking in regards to the current state of recycling.

Filmography

Film

Television
{|class="wikitable
|-
|Year
|Title
|Role
|Type
|-
| 1974
| Silent Number
| Guest role: Futility Cragg
| TV series, 1 episode
|-
| 1975
| Armchair Cinema
| Guest role: Secretary
| TV series UK, 1 episode
|-
| 1976
| Secret Doors
| Role unknown
| TV movie
|-
| 1976
| Chopper Squad
| Lead role: Georgia Batie
| TV pilot
|-
| 1978
| Cop Shop
| Guest role: Carla Moore
| TV series, 2 episodes
|-
| 1978-1979
| Glenview High
| Regular role: Robbie Dean
| TV series, 39 episodes
|-
| 1979-1981
| The Young Doctors
| Regular role: Liz Kennedy
| TV series, 42 episodes
|-
| 1980
| The Mike Walsh Show
| Herself - Guest
| TV series, 1 episode
|-
| 1981
| Holiday Island
| Guest role: Trish McKenzie
| TV pilot series, 2 episodes
|-
| 1981
| The 1981 Australian Film Awards
| Herself - Presenter with Mike Preston
| ABC TV special
|-
| 1982
| Watch This Space
| Herself
| ABC TV series
|-
| 1982
| A Country Practice
| Guest role: Robin Nichols
| TV series, 2 episodes
|-
| 1983
| Return to Eden
| Lead role: Stephanie Harper / Tara Welles
| TV miniseries, 3 episodes
|-
| 1984
| City West
| Recurring role: Jean Cheney
| SBS TV series, 7 episodes
|-
| 1984
| Carson's Law
| Guest role: Debra Grayson
| TV series, 1 episode
|-
| 1985
| Special Squad
| Guest role
| TV series, 1 episode
|-
| 1985
| Five Mile Creek
| Guest role: Miss Armstrong
| TV series, 1 episode
|-
| 1986
| Return to Eden
| Lead regular role: Stephanie Harper
| TV series, 22 episodes
|-
| 1986
| The Blue Lightning
| Lead role: Kate McQueen
| TV movie
|-
| 1987
| Danger Down Under aka 'Harris Down Under'
| Lead role: Sharon Harris
| TV movie, AUSTRALIA/US
|-
| 1987
| Have a Go
| Herself - Guest Judge
| TV series, 3 episodes
|-
| 1988
| A Dangerous Life
| Lead role: Angie Fox
| ABC TV miniseries US/AUSTRALIA/UK/PHILIPPINES, 2 episodes
|-
| 1989
| The Saint In Australia aka 'Fear In Fun Park'
| Lead role: Aileen
| TV movie
|-
| 1990
| Making of 'Heaven Tonight'''
| Herself / Annie Dysart
| TV special
|-
| 1990
| The Paper Man| Lead role: Virginia Morgan
| ABC TV miniseries
|-
| 1993
| G.P.| Guest role: Jenna Clarke
| ABC TV series, 1 episode
|-
| 1993-2001
| Our House| Herself - Presenter
| TV series
|-
| 1993-1995
| Good Morning Australia| Herself - Guest
| TV series
|-
| 1994
| The Raid| Herself - Narrator (voice)
| Film documentary
|-
| 1995;1998
| Midday| Herself - Guest
| TV series, 1 episode
|-
| 1995
| Sunday| Herself - Guest
| TV series, 1 episode
|-
| 1995
| 50 Fantastic Years (Part 2)| Herself - Presenter
| TV special
|-
| 1995
| MBA Excellence In Housing| Herself
| TV special
|-
| 1996
| 40 Years Of Television: The Reel History| Herself - Presenter
| TV special
|-
| 1997
| Mystique of the Pearl| Herself - Narrator (voice)
| TV documentary
|-
| 1997
| Sex and Beyond: 25 Years of Cleo| Herself
| TV special
|-
| 1998
| Midday With Kerri-Anne| Herself - Guest
| TV series, 1 episode
|-
| 1998
| Catch Phrase| Herself - Contestant
| TV series, 1 episode
|-
| 1999
| Stone Forever| Herself 
| SBS TV special
|-
| 2002
| The Dragon Chronicles| Herself - Voice
| Animated TV series
|-
| 2005
| The Naked Country: Exclusive Interview with Actress Rebecca Gilling| Herself / Mary Dillon
| Video
|-
| 2006
| 9am with David & Kim| Herself - Guest
| TV series, 1 episode
|-
| 2006
| Where Are They Now| Herself with The Young Doctors cast
| TV series, 1 episode
|-
| 2008
| Not Quite Hollywood: Deleted and Extended Scenes| Herself
| Video
|-
| 2010;2012
| The Circle| Herself - Guest CEO Planet Ark
| TV series, 2 episodes
|-
| 2016
| The Man From Hong Kong: Uncut 'Not Quite Hollywood' Interviews| Herself - Actress in 'The Man From Hong Kong'
| Video
|-
| 2016
| The Making of 'The Man From Hong Kong'| Herself - Actress in 'The Man From Hong Kong'
| Video
|-
| 2019
| The Project| Herself - Guest CEO Planet Ark
| TV series, 1 episode
|-
| 2020
| Studio 10| Herself - Guest CEO Planet Ark
| TV series, 1 episode
|-
| 2021
| ABC News| Herself - Guest Deputy CEO Planet Ark
| TV series, 1 episode
|-
| 2022
| The Morning Show| Herself - Deputy CEO Planet Ark
| TV series, 1 episode
|}

Stage/theatre
 What The Butler Saw? (1970)
 False Accusations (1994-1995)
 The Mudlarks'' (1995)

References and footnotes

1953 births
Australian television actresses
Australian people of English descent
Living people